The Schluchberg (2,106 m) is a mountain of the Uri Alps, located on the border between the Swiss cantons of Obwalden and Nidwalden. It is the highest summit of the chain north of the Storegg pass.

References

External links
 Schluchberg on Hikr

Mountains of the Alps
Mountains of Obwalden
Mountains of Nidwalden
Nidwalden–Obwalden border
Two-thousanders of Switzerland
Mountains of Switzerland
Kerns, Switzerland